is a special ward located in Tokyo Metropolis, Japan. It is located to the north of the heart of Tokyo. The ward consists of two separate areas: a small strip of land between the Sumida River and Arakawa River and a larger area north of the Arakawa River. The ward is bordered by the cities of Kawaguchi, Sōka and Yashio in Saitama and Katsushika, Sumida, Arakawa and Kita in Tokyo. The ward is called Adachi City in English.

As of May 1, 2015, the ward has an estimated population of 692,707 and a population density of 13,010 persons per km². The total area is 53.25 km².

The Adachi Land Transportation Office is located here, and automobiles registered at this office bear Adachi number plates.

History
Under the Ritsuryō system, the present-day ward was the southern extremity of Adachi District, Musashi Province. In 826, during the Heian period, the Nishiarai Daishi temple was founded. During the Muromachi period and into the Sengoku period, the Chiba clan held control of the region. The Great Senju Bridge was built in 1594. In the Edo period, parts were under the direct control of the Tokugawa shogunate, and parts were under the administration of Kan'ei-ji, a temple in present-day Ueno, Tokyo. Adachi was also home to Senju-shuku was a post station on both the Nikkō Kaidō and the Mito Kaidō. The shogunate maintained the Kozukappara execution grounds in Senju.

In 1932, Adachi, formerly known as Minamiadachi District, became a ward of Tokyo City. The special ward was founded on March 15, 1947.

Districts and neighborhoods

Ayase Area
 Adachi
 Aoi
 Ayase
 Kōdō
 Nishi Ayase
Fuchie Area
 Higashi Hokima
 Higashi Rokugatsu-chō
 Hodzuka-chō
 Hokima
 Nishi Hokima
 Rokuchō
 Rokugatsu
 Takenotsuka
Hanahata Area
 Hanahata
 Kahei
 Kitakaheichō
 Minami Hanabatake
 Mutsuki
 Nishi Kahei
 Shinmei
 Shinmei Minami
 Tatsunuma
 Yanaka

Higashi Fuchie Area
 Higashi Ayase
 Nakagawa
 Ōyata
 Sano
 Tōwa
Ikō Area
 Higashi Ikō
 Ikō
 Ikōhon-chō
 Nishi Ikō
 Nishi Ikōchō
 Nishi Takenotsuka
Kōhoku Area
 Horinouchi
 Kaga
 Kōhoku
 Miyagi
 Nitta
 Odai
 Saranuma
 Shikahama
 Tsubaki
 Yazaike
Nishi Arai Area
 Motoki
 Motoki Higashi-machi
 Motoki Kita-machi
 Motoki Minami-machi
 Motoki Nishi-machi
 Nishi Arai
 Nishi Arai Honchō
 Ōgi
 Okino
 Sekihara

Senju Area
 Hinodemachi
 Senju
 Senju Motomachi
 Senju Akebono-chō
 Senju Asahi-chō
 Senju Azuma
 Senju Hashido-chō
 Senju Kawahara-chō
 Senju Kotobuki-chō
 Senju Midori-chō
 Senju Miyamoto-chō
 Senju Naka-chō
 Senju Nakai-chō
 Senju Ōkawa-chō
 Senju Sakuragi
 Senju Sekiya-chō
 Senju Tatsuta-chō
 Senju Yanagi-chō
 Yanagihara
Toneri Area
 Iriya
 Iriya-chō
 Kojiya
 Kojiya Honchō
 Toneri
 Toneri Kōen
 Tonerimachi
Umejima Area
 Chūō Honmachi
 Hirano
 Hitotsuya
 Kurihara
 Nishi Arai Sakae-chō
 Shimane
 Umeda
 Umejima

Sights

Nishiarai Daishi
Nishiarai Daishi, located in Nishiarai, is a temple of the Buzan branch of Shingon Buddhism. Its formal name is Gochisan Henjōin Sōji-ji (Sōji-ji Temple). This is one of the Three Great Temples in the Kantō region along with Kawasaki Daishi and Sano Yakuyoke Daishi, and a large number of people annually visit the temple at New Year.

Parks
Toneri Park:
Toneri Park is a metropolitan park located in Toneri. It is divided into east and west sections by Ogubashi Street. The west site has sports facilities such as an athletic stadium, tennis courts and baseball grounds. The east site has a big pond, water park and bird sanctuary. A part of the east site is now under construction. The park can be accessed by arriving at Toneri-kōen Station on the Nippori-Toneri Liner or by bus.
Higashi Ayase Park:
Higashi Ayase Park is a metropolitan park that straddles the border between Ayase and Higashi Ayase. It contains Tokyo Budokan. Within the park, there is a Japanese garden which has a wide variety of plants. It also has sports facilities such as baseball and gateball grounds.
Urban Agricultural Park:
Urban Agricultural Park (Toshi Nōgyō Kōen), located in Shikahama, is run by Adachi Ward.  Officially, it is a part of Kōhoku Park. It is located near the meeting of the Shiba and Arakawa Rivers, and its south end faces a green space on the Arakawa river area. There are fields, orchards, greenhouses and other facilities that aim to show farming techniques that have been adopted in the suburbs of Tokyo. There are also facilities for families such as lawns and play equipment.

There is a rest house near the entrance on the Arakawa riverbank side. The rest house is at the point where the Arakawa and Shibakawa cycling roads meet. There is no admission fee.  It is closed early in the morning and late at night, as well as all day on some days such as the year-end and new-year holidays. The park is far from the train station, but there is a bus running from Nishiarai Station to the park. The park is about a five-minute walk south of the bus stop Shikahama 5 on Kawaguchi Station line (Shikahama-Ryōke) and Akabane Station line (to Nishiarai Station by way of Arakawa Bridge). There is parking for cars and sightseeing buses under the Shuto Expressway Kawaguchi Route, and Shikahamabashi Exit and Higashi Ryōke Exit are nearby. The parking lot is also close to Kan-nana Road.
Adachi Park of Living Things:
Adachi Park of Living Things, located within Motofuchie Park in Hokima, is run by Adachi Ward.

Halls and cultural facilities
Tokyo Budokan:
Tokyo Budokan, located within Higashi Ayase Metropolitan Park, is a sports facility run by Tokyo Sport Benefits Corporation. The Tokyo Budokan has an avant-garde building designed by a famous architect Kijō Rokkaku. It includes places for martial arts and Kyūdō, and training rooms. The word budokan means "martial arts hall," and the same word is part of the name of the more-famous Nippon Budokan. The Tokyo Budokan's address is 3-20-1 Ayase, Adachi, Tokyo.
Galaxy+City:
Galaxy+City (Gyarakushitii) is a generic term for series of cultural facilities in Kurihara.  It used to be run by Adachi Lifelong Educational Promotion Corporation, but the management was taken over by Youth Centre of Adachi Board of Education on 1 April 2005.  It contains two main facilities: Nishiarai Culture Hall (theatre) and Adachi Children's Science Museum.  There are also event halls, cafes and others.
Theatre 1010:
Theatre 1010 was named as it is because the number 1010 (Senjū) and the name of the theatre's location (Senju) are homonyms in Japanese.
Adachi Historical Museum:
Adachi Historical Museum, located within Higashifuchie Park in Ōyata, is run by Adachi Ward.
Senju Thermal Power Station

Education

The city's public high schools are operated by the Tokyo Metropolitan Government Board of Education.

The city's public elementary and junior high schools are operated by the Adachi City Board of Education (足立区教育委員会). 

International schools:
  - North Korean school

Tokyo Future University is located in the area.

Sister cities
Adachi has sister-city relationships with Belmont, Australia. Within Japan, Adachi has similar ties with the city of Uonuma (formerly the town of Koide) in Niigata Prefecture, Yamanouchi in Nagano Prefecture, and the city of Kanuma in Tochigi Prefecture.

Transportation

Rail
The primary railway station in the city is Kita-Senju Station.

  JR East
  Jōban Line -  - 
  Tobu Railway
  Skytree Line -  -  - Kita-Senju -  -  -  -  -  -
  Daishi Line Nishiarai - 
  Keisei Electric Railway
  Keisei Main Line -  -  -
  Tokyo Metro
  Hibiya Line - Kita-Senju
  Chiyoda Line - Kita-Senju - Ayase - 
  Metropolitan Intercity Railway Company
  Tsukuba Express - Kita-Senju -  -  -
  Tokyo Metropolitan Bureau of Transportation
  Nippori-Toneri Liner -  -  -  -  -  -  -  -  -

Highways
Shuto Expressway
No.6 Misato Route (Kosuge JCT - Misato JCT)
C2 Central Loop (Itabashi JCT - Kasai JCT)
S1 Kawaguchi Route (Kōhoku JCT - Kawaguchi JCT)

Notable people

Atsuko Asano, actress
Back-On, rock band
Tochiazuma Daisuke, sumo wrestler
Kouta Hirano, manga artist
Susumu Hirasawa, progressive-electronic musician
Itsuki Hirata, mixed martial artist
Jo Kamisaku, murderer of Junko Furuta
Kaela Kimura, singer and model
Takeshi Kitano, comedian and filmmaker
Daijiro Morohoshi, manga artist
Nujabes, hip hop artist/producer
Mayumi Ogawa, actress
Masatoshi Ono, rock/heavy metal singer
Mika Akino, professional wrestler
Tetsuya Naito, professional wrestler
Tetsuya Shimizu, professional wrestler
Yoshiko Tanaka, actress
Kyohei Wada, professional wrestling referee
Kenta Yamazaki, soccer player

References

External links

Adachi City Official Website 

 
Wards of Tokyo